Antony John James (born 5 November 1989) is an English competitive swimmer who has represented Great Britain in the Olympics, FINA world championships and European championships, and England in the Commonwealth Games.  At the 2012 Summer Olympics in London, he competed in the men's 100-metre butterfly. Alongside swimming he has completed a Bsc (Hons) in Psychology at Plymouth University.

International Results

References

External links
 
 
 
 
 

1989 births
Living people
English male swimmers
Male butterfly swimmers
Olympic swimmers of Great Britain
Sportspeople from Plymouth, Devon
Swimmers at the 2012 Summer Olympics
Commonwealth Games medallists in swimming
Commonwealth Games silver medallists for England
Commonwealth Games bronze medallists for England
Swimmers at the 2010 Commonwealth Games
Alumni of the University of Plymouth
Medallists at the 2010 Commonwealth Games